William Henry "Fiddler Bill" McGee (November 16, 1909 – February 11, 1987) was a pitcher in Major League Baseball. He played for the St. Louis Cardinals and New York Giants. His key pitch was the sinker.

References

External links

1909 births
1987 deaths
Major League Baseball pitchers
St. Louis Cardinals players
New York Giants (NL) players
Keokuk Indians players
Houston Buffaloes players
Columbus Red Birds players
Baseball players from Illinois